A Children's bicycle seat is a saddle that is designed to be put on a bicycle for children to be transported in. The most common place for child bicycle seats are in the rear of the bicycle.

Child safety
Cycling equipment